Noel Leon Barnett (22 November 1908 – 21 July 2000) was an Australian rules footballer who played with Melbourne in the Victorian Football League (VFL).

Barnett made 11 appearances for Melbourne in the 1933 VFL season, after arriving from West Albury Football Club.

While he was in Melbourne in 1933, West Albury changed its name to the Albury Football Club and Barnett returned to play with the Albury and took over from Cleaver Bunton as captain-coach for the final few games in 1934.

Barnett won the Ovens & Murray Football League's best and fairest award, the Morris Medal in 1935.

References

External links
 DemonWiki profile
 1928 Ovens & Murray FL Runners Up: St. Patrick's FC team photo

1908 births
Australian rules footballers from New South Wales
Melbourne Football Club players
Albury Football Club players
Albury Football Club coaches
2000 deaths